Valjevska Pivara, or Valjevo Brewery, is a Serbian brewery based in Valjevo.

History
The origins of Valjevska Pivara trace back to 1860 and in current form it operates since 28 February 1952.

In 2003, Valjevska Pivara was sold to consortium "Atlas Grupa" for 22 million dinars. In July 2010, the company went into bankruptcy procedure due to insolvency and in January 2011 the Government of Serbia took over it by converting its debts to shares.

As of February 2016, Valjevska Pivara was the sole government-owned brewery in Serbia that operated positively, although it has minor market share compared to Carlsberg Srbija, Apatin Brewery and Heineken Srbija.

In October 2018, the Ministry of Economy of Serbia auctioned Valjevska Pivara for 7.05 million euros, but there were no interested parties. On 17 January 2019, in a second auction, the brewery was sold for 3.5 million euros to the Serbian newly established company "Brauerei Group".

References

External links
 

Breweries of Serbia
1952 establishments in Serbia
Companies based in Valjevo
Food and drink companies established in 1952
Serbian brands